San Roque may refer to:

People
 Saint Roch (14th century), French Catholic saint
 Roque González y de Santa Cruz (1576–1628), Spanish Catholic saint

Places

Argentina
 San Roque, Corrientes, a city in Corrientes Province
 San Roque Department, a department of Corrientes Province
 San Roque Lake, an artificial lake in Córdoba
 Aguada San Roque, a village and municipality in Neuquén Province

Costa Rica
 San Roque District, Barva, Heredia
 San Roque District, Grecia, Alajuela

Paraguay
 San Roque (Asunción), a neighborhood of Asunción
 San Roque González de Santa Cruz, a district in Paraguarí Department

Peru
 San Roque de Cumbaza, a town in the San Martín Region
 San Roque de Cumbaza District, a district of Lamas
 San Roque, a neighborhood in Santiago de Surco, Lima

Philippines
 San Roque, Northern Samar, a municipality
 San Roque, a barangay in Gapan, Nueva Ecija
 San Roque, a barangay in Navotas, Metro Manila
 San Roque, a barangay in Pateros, Metro Manila
 San Roque, a barangay in Santo Tomas, Batangas
 San Roque, a barangay in Tubajon, Dinagat Islands
 San Roque, a barangay in Zamboanga City
 San Roque West, Agoo, La Union

Spain
 San Roque, O Vicedo, a village in San Miguel das Negradas, Galicia
 San Roque, Spain, a municipality in Cádiz, Andalusia
 San Roque de Riomiera, a municipality in Cantabria

Other places

 San Roque Lake (Bolivia), a lake in Iténez Province, Beni Department
 San Roque, Antioquia, Colombia, a municipality
 San Roque, Quito, Ecuador, an electoral parish or district
 San Roque, Saipan, Northern Mariana Islands, a village
 San Roque, Santa Barbara, California, US, a residential neighborhood

Other uses
 Battle of San Roque, an 1829 battle of the Argentine Civil War
 CD San Roque, a football club in San Roque, Cadiz, Andalusia, Spain
 CD San Roque de Lepe, a football club in Lepe, Andalusia, Spain
 Club de Rugby San Roque, a rugby union club in Valencia, Spain
 San Roque Club, a country club in San Roque, Andalusia
 San Roque railway station, in San Roque, Andalusia

See also
 Roque (disambiguation)
 San Roque Dam (disambiguation)
 São Roque (disambiguation)